Riga Region, officially Riga Planning Region and shortened as RPR is one of five planning regions of Latvia, situated in the central part of Latvia, in and around the metropolis of Riga and along the shores of the Gulf of Riga. The state institution was founded on 12 October 2006, based on the creation of the region territory as prescribed by Regulations No. 133 of the Cabinet of Ministers as of 25 March 2003, the "Regulations on Territories of Planning Regions".

Organisation 
According to the "Law on Regional Development Riga Planning Region", Riga Region is supervised by the Ministry of Regional Development and Local Government, the decision-making authority is Riga Planning Region Development Council (RPRDC), which consists of 18 deputies appointed by the heads of the local municipalities comprising the region.

Geography 
The Riga Region was created in 2006, covering the territory and using the administrative boundaries of the now defunct districts of Latvia: Limbaži, Ogre, Riga and Tukums as well as the cities of Riga and Jūrmala.  the region consists of 28 municipalities and 2 republican cities with an area of 10,430.1 km².

Demography 
A little over 52% of the Latvian population lives in Riga Region, which makes it the largest region in the Baltic states with 989,525 inhabitants in 2021 and a population density of 95 per km².

Economy 

In 2020 Riga Region had GDP of €20.9 billion of which €16.0 billion was in Riga city.

See also 
Planning regions of Latvia
Administrative divisions of Latvia

References

External links 
Riga Region website

Subdivisions of Latvia